Bildad may refer to:

People
 Bildad, in the Hebrew Bible, one of three friends of Job.
 Bildad, a Quaker shipowner in Moby-Dick.

Places
Bildad a village in Iran